Aoba (written: 青葉) is a Japanese surname. Notable people with the surname include:

Ichiko Aoba (青葉 市子) (born 1990), Japanese singer-songwriter
 (born 1978), Japanese Go player
, Japanese voice actress
 (born 1979), Japanese footballer

Fictional characters
, a character in Mahoraba
, a character in Katekyo Hitman Reborn!
, a character in Neon Genesis Evangelion
, a character in New Game!
, a character in Captain Tsubasa
The Aoba was a Salamis-Class Cruiser in the Mobile Suit Gundam universe
, a character in Jinki:EXTEND
, a character in the popular manga and anime series Naruto
, the protagonist of BL (Boy's Love) game  DRAMAtical Murder
, a character in the multimedia franchise BanG Dream!

Japanese-language surnames